East New Market Historic District is a national historic district in East New Market, Dorchester County, Maryland. It consists of a village of about 75 buildings that represent a variety of 18th-, 19th-, and 20th-century architectural styles.

It was added to the National Register of Historic Places in 1975.

References

External links
, including photo dated 2002, at Maryland Historical Trust
Boundary Map of the East New Market Historic District, Dorchester County, at Maryland Historical Trust

Historic districts in Dorchester County, Maryland
Federal architecture in Maryland
Victorian architecture in Maryland
Colonial Revival architecture in Maryland
Historic districts on the National Register of Historic Places in Maryland
National Register of Historic Places in Dorchester County, Maryland